Daurice Fountain (born December 22, 1995) is an American football wide receiver for the Chicago Bears of the National Football League (NFL). He played college football at Northern Iowa.

College career
In 2017, Fountain had 943 receiving yards and 12 touchdowns. He was invited to the East-West Shrine Game and was named offensive MVP. Nevertheless, he was not invited to the NFL scouting combine.

Professional career

Indianapolis Colts
Fountain was drafted by the Indianapolis Colts in the fifth round, 159th overall, of the 2018 NFL Draft. He was waived on September 1, 2018 and was signed to the practice squad the next day. On December 7, Fountain was promoted to the active roster.

On August 19, 2019, Fountain was placed on injured reserve after undergoing ankle surgery.

Fountain signed a one-year exclusive-rights free agent tender with the team on March 31, 2020. He was waived on September 5, 2020 and signed to the practice squad the next day. He was promoted to the active roster on September 16, 2020. He recorded his first career reception in the Colts week 3 game against the New York Jets. The reception would be a 12-yard reception. He was waived on October 31, 2020, and re-signed to the practice squad three days later. He was elevated to the active roster on November 7 for the team's week 9 game against the Baltimore Ravens, and reverted to the practice squad after the game. His practice squad contract with the team expired after the season on January 18, 2021.

Kansas City Chiefs
Fountain signed with the Kansas City Chiefs on May 17, 2021. He was released on October 12, 2021. He signed to the practice squad on October 14, 2021. He signed a reserve/future contract with the Chiefs on February 2, 2022.

On August 30, 2022, Fountain was waived by the Chiefs and signed to the practice squad the next day. He was elevated to the active roster on September 10, 2022, via a standard elevation which caused him to revert back to the practice squad after the game. He was released on October 24, 2022.

Chicago Bears
On October 26, 2022, the Chicago Bears signed Fountain to their practice squad. He signed a reserve/future contract on January 10, 2023.

Career statistics

References

External links
 Northern Iowa bio

1995 births
Living people
Sportspeople from Madison, Wisconsin
Players of American football from Wisconsin
American football wide receivers
Northern Iowa Panthers football players
Indianapolis Colts players
Kansas City Chiefs players
Chicago Bears players